Slave dynasty may refer to:

Mamluk dynasty (Delhi) (1206–1290)
Mamluk Sultanate of Egypt (1250–1517)